The  is an electric multiple unit (EMU) train type operated by Japanese private railway operator Kintetsu Railway for use on luxury Shimakaze limited express services since March 2013.

Operations

A special supplement is required to travel on these services, in addition to the basic fare and limited express charge. The 50000 series is one of the only normal service trains (as opposed to cruise trains and tourist excursions) to feature a dining car in Japan.

Formation
The three six-car trains are formed as shown below.

Car 2 is fitted with two PT126-A single-arm pantographs, and cars 4 and 5 are each fitted with one.

Interior
The seats are covered in cream-coloured leather and feature individual controls for lumbar support and an inflate/deflate feature to help customers relax. Car 3 features cafeteria seating on two levels (6 seats on the lower level and 13 on the upper level). The upper level of the car features a wave-pattern counter along one side of the car. A spacious wheelchair-accessible toilet features a changing board for passengers to stand on to change clothes. The car also features a powder room for female passengers. Car 4 features 4-person Japanese and western-style compartments and 6-person semi-open compartments.

Exterior
The train is painted in a sky blue and crystal white livery, reminiscent of the Ise-Shima ocean resort region. The train is named for the Shima region, and kaze, Japanese for "wind".

Bogies
The trains run on bolsterless bogies with full active suspension. The motored bogies are designated KD-320, and the trailer bogies are designated KD-320A.

History
Starting in 2009, market research was conducted to help design the train; over 14,000 people were asked for their opinion. The study showed that over 60% of visitors to the region were female; this information was used to add the fitting boards and powder rooms to the design. The first 50000 series set was delivered from Kinki Sharyo in September 2012. The two trainsets entered revenue service on 21 March 2013. In May 2014, the 50000 series was awarded the 2014 Blue Ribbon Award, presented annually by the Japan Railfan Club. A presentation ceremony was held on 20 September 2014 at Kyoto Station.

A third set entered service in October 2014.

References

External links

 Kintetsu Shimakaze 

Electric multiple units of Japan
50000 series
Train-related introductions in 2013
1500 V DC multiple units of Japan
Kinki Sharyo multiple units